"Here in Your Bedroom" is a song by the American punk rock band Goldfinger. It was the lead single from their  self-titled debut studio album in 1996, released on Mojo Records. The song is based on the band's frontman, John Feldmann, and a brief relationship he had with a woman. The song was the band's biggest chart success, peaking at number five on Billboard Modern Rock Tracks in the United States. It also peaked at number 11 on RPM Alternative 30 in Canada, and at number 47 on Billboard Hot 100 Airplay chart.

Background
"Here in Your Bedroom" was based on Goldfinger frontman John Feldmann's personal experiences. He was working at a store selling shoes, and he had a crush on a woman working in the dress department for over eight months. "'Here in Your Bedroom' is all about those wacky emotions that a sensitive guy like me gets at a time like that. When we were in her room, there was nothing else going on in the world but me and her," he told Billboard when the song achieved success. He noted that the experience was beneficial as a songwriter, as he gained three new songs from it. They first got together on New Year's 1995:

In addition, Feldmann was inspired by his visiting sister, whom he had not seen in a year. As for the girl, she quickly broke up with Feldmann and moved to Texas. Upon the song's twentieth anniversary in 2016, Feldmann called it his favorite song on the band's self-titled debut album, Goldfinger.

Formats and track listing
All songs written by John Feldmann, except where noted.

CD maxi single (UND 56010)
"Here in Your Bedroom" – 3:12
"Nothing to Prove" (Feldmann, Charlie Paulson) – 2:33
"Pictures (Live Version)" – 2:20

Charts

References

External links

1996 singles
1996 songs
Songs written by John Feldmann
Song recordings produced by Jay Rifkin
Goldfinger (band) songs
American alternative rock songs